, real name , is a Japanese actress, singer, fiction writer, TV entertainer and former adult video (AV) actress.

Life and career
Mihiro was born in Niigata prefecture on May 19, 1982. She began a career as a softcore nude model as early as May 2001 when her video Dream (どりーむ) was released followed by the publication of the similarly named photobook Dream (夢) in August 2002. She appeared in a number of other softcore nude modeling videos and photobooks over the next year and a half.  Mihiro also acted in several softcore V-Cinema productions during this time including the 2003 comedy  directed by Naoyuki Tomomatsu. and Kōji Kawano's 2004 . She was also featured as a singer in a J-Pop Maxi single titled Sunflower (ヒマワリ) for Dream Robot in October 2004.

AV debut – Alice Japan & MAX-A
Mihiro made her transition from nude model to AV actress in January 2005 when Alice Japan released her debut adult video Little Angel. A month later, she made her first video for the MAX-A studio, Super Star. For the next two and a half years until mid-2007, Mihiro made about one AV a month alternating between Alice Japan and MAX-A.  At the same time, Mihiro was also appearing on TV in the TV Asahi drama  or Mission Section Chief Hitoshi Tadano. She was in Episode 1 of the second year series (Whole Episode 12) of the program broadcast on January 14, 2005.

She began 2006 with a regular role in TV Tokyo's romantic comedy, which ran in 12 episodes from January to March 2006. In April 2006, she was one of the leads in the V-Cinema horror film, Zombie Self-Defense Force directed by pink film and horror movie director Naoyuki Tomomatsu. Throughout 2006, she continued appearing in monthly adult videos for MAX-A and Alice Japan.

In another genre, Mihiro was the star of the November 2006 V-Cinema release , an erotic parody of the manga-inspired movie Yo-Yo Girl Cop. She played a teenaged undercover government agent armed with a steel yo-yo and see-through panties. One reviewer commented that Mihiro's was "the only performance of note". The DVD was released in the US with English subtitles in November 2008.

Mihiro continued her singing career with an all AV Idol group, the  "Man-zoku ディーバ Divas" which originally consisted of Mihiro, Akiho Yoshizawa and Naho Ozawa. Ozawa later left the group which was eventually expanded to five singers.

Mihiro's final videos for the MAX-A and Alice Japan studios were released in the first half of 2007. She returned to TV work in 2007 as a regular cast member in the TV Asahi suspense drama  which was broadcast April–June 2007 and she also appeared as a guest star in Episode 1 of the erotic drama  which was aired by TV Asahi in August 2007.

Maxing & S1
From July 2007, Mihiro began making videos with two new AV studios, Maxing and S1 No. 1 Style. She kept to her previous pattern of doing one movie per month, alternating between the two companies. At the 2007 Vegas Night Moodyz Awards, Mihiro took the 2nd Place Award for Best Actress and her debut video for S1, Hyper-Risky Mosaic Mihiro, directed by Hideto Aki, won the Best Title Award.

In the mainstream film arena, she starred as Ms Lin, the owner of a dumpling shop with a "secret ingredient", in director Kōji Kawano's 2008 V-Cinema erotic horror-comedy Cruel Restaurant. She had previously worked with Kawano in the 2004 video Chakuero no onna Karina. Along with other S1 actresses Sora Aoi, Yuma Asami and Rio, Mihiro was one of the regular cast members doing songs and comedy on the late night TV Osaka variety show  which began broadcasting in April 2008. She has also done a number of TV skits with Japanese comedian Ken Shimura.

In 2009 Mihiro continued her AV career with S1 and Maxing but she also appeared in roles in theatrical movies, the first being in March, in the drama , also known as 8000 Miles. The movie, directed by Yū Irie, follows a group of aspiring rap singers in Tokyo's Saitama prefecture. The film was awarded the Grand Prix at the 19th Yubari International Fantastic Film Festival in 2009. In June 2009 she was in Ju-on: White Ghost / Black Ghost, part of the famous Japanese Ju-on series re-made in the US as The Grudge. Later, in July she had a part in the action-horror gore-fest by director Kengo Kaji, Samurai Princess: Devil Princess.

Autobiography and retirement
Mihiro published an autobiographical memoir titled nude, detailing her early life and entry into AV. The book was released by Kodansha on May 19, 2009. Her book is one of a number of autobiographical works by actresses about the AV industry going back to Ai Iijima's novel Platonic Sex in 2000, and including Saori Hara's My Real Name Is Mai Kato: Why I Became an AV Actress from December 2009, and Honoka's 2010 book Biography of Honoka: Mama, I Love You, which adult media reporter Rio Yasuda sees as marking a trend in which the AV industry is being assimilated into popular culture.

Also in 2009, she traveled to Korea to promote a four-part dramatic TV series Korean Classroom, a joint Korean-Japanese production which aired on Korean TV in May 2009. The series, which also starred AV Idols Sora Aoi and Rio (Tina Yuzuki), deals with three Japanese girls who travel to Korea and fall for some local men.

In 2010, in addition to her regular schedule of adult videos for S1 and Maxing, she starred in the low-budget comedy , released in February and directed by Dai Sakō. In May 2010, it was announced that Mihiro's autobiographical work nude would be made into a movie starring Naoko Watanabe and directed by Yuichi Onuma. The movie started shooting in May and was released on September 10th, 2010.

Earlier in the year Mihiro had announced her retirement from AV and her last two videos were Mihiro Channel for Maxing and her retirement work, the 2-disc Mihiro Final - Special Technique on June 19, 2010 for S1. In 2012, the major Japanese adult video distributor DMM held a poll of its customers to choose the 100 all-time best AV actresses to celebrate the 30th anniversary of adult videos in Japan. Mihiro finished in 83rd place in the balloting.

Later career
In 2013, Mihiro starred in the Toho comedy Goddotan kiss patience Championship - The Movie, a film adaption of the popular TV Tokyo variety show. Since 2017 she's been a member of the newly reformed Ebisu Muscats and performs regularly with the band. She also discontinued the selling of her former AV work from DMM.com by the so-called "5-year rule" (introduced around 2016), that allows AV actresses to stop the mainstream distribution of their videos five years after retirement.

Filmography

Theatrical films
  (November 2006)
  (March 2009)
 Ju-on: White Ghost / Black Ghost (June 2009)
 Samurai Princess: Devil Princess (July 2009)
  (February 2010)
 nude (September 2010)
 Goddotan kiss patience Championship - The Movie (June 2013)

Gravure videos

Adult videos (AV)

V-Cinema

Photobooks
 .
 .
 .

In other media
Mihiro voiced Mai, a character in the 2005 videogame Yakuza

References

External links 

 
 
 
 
 
 

1982 births
Japanese pornographic film actresses
Japanese women pop singers
Japanese television personalities
Japanese women writers
Living people
Musicians from Niigata Prefecture
Actors from Niigata Prefecture
Ebisu Muscats
Models from Niigata Prefecture